Apocorophium is a genus of amphipod crustaceans, comprising the following species:
Apocorophium acutum (Chevreux, 1908)
Apocorophium curumim Valério-Berardo & Thiago de Souza, 2009
Apocorophium lacustre (Vanhöffen, 1911)
Apocorophium louisianum (Shoemaker, 1934)
Apocorophium simile (Shoemaker, 1943)

References

Corophiidea